Baca County is a county located in the U.S. state of Colorado. As of the 2020 census, the population was 3,506. The county seat is Springfield.
Located at the southeast corner of Colorado, the county shares state borders with Kansas, New Mexico, and Oklahoma.

History
Baca County was created by the Colorado legislature on April 16, 1889, out of eastern portions of Las Animas County. Baca County was named in honor of pioneer and Colorado territorial legislator Felipe Baca.

Prior to the 1880s there was little activity in the county, other than along the Cutoff Branch of the Santa Fe Trail that crosses its extreme southeastern corner. The 1910s saw wet years and expansion due to the increase in acreage that could be homesteaded.  World War I also brought increased demand for agricultural products.  The arrival of the Santa Fe Railroad in 1926 created new towns and a population increase.

The Dust Bowl arrived in the 1930s, with Baca County being one of the hardest hit areas.  This prompted soil conservation efforts by the federal government. Part of this effort was the purchase of cultivated land by the government in order to return it to grassland.  Today the U.S. Forest Service supervises 220,000 acres of Comanche National Grassland which was purchased in the 1930s. These areas include Carrizo Creek and Picture Canyon.  The Colorado Division of Wildlife maintains the recreational areas at Two Buttes Lake and Turk's Pond.

On May 18, 1977, an F4 tornado struck the southeastern portion of Baca County, causing an estimated $2.5 million in damage. It tracked from Keyes, Oklahoma, where damage was estimated at $25,000. As of 2020, this is the only F4/EF4 tornado ever recorded in Colorado since 1950.

Geography

Adjacent counties
Prowers County, Colorado (north)
Stanton County, Kansas (east/Central Time border)
Morton County, Kansas (east/Central Time border)
Cimarron County, Oklahoma (south/Central Time border)
Union County, New Mexico (southwest)
Las Animas County, Colorado (west)
Bent County, Colorado (northwest)

Major Highways
  U.S. Highway 160
  U.S. Highway 385
  State Highway 116

National historic trail
Santa Fe National Historic Trail

Demographics

As of the census of 2000, there were 4,517 people, 1,905 households, and 1,268 families residing in the county.  The population density was 2 people per square mile (1/km2).  There were 2,364 housing units at an average density of 1 per square mile (0/km2).  The racial makeup of the county was 93.73% White, 0.04% Black or African American, 1.20% Native American, 0.15% Asian, 0.09% Pacific Islander, 2.99% from other races, and 1.79% from two or more races.  7.02% of the population were Hispanic or Latino of any race.

There were 1,905 households, out of which 28.40% had children under the age of 18 living with them, 56.80% were married couples living together, 7.50% had a female householder with no husband present, and 33.40% were non-families. 30.40% of all households were made up of individuals, and 15.70% had someone living alone who was 65 years of age or older.  The average household size was 2.33 and the average family size was 2.90.

In the county, the population was spread out, with 24.50% under the age of 18, 5.90% from 18 to 24, 22.70% from 25 to 44, 24.50% from 45 to 64, and 22.40% who were 65 years of age or older.  The median age was 43 years. For every 100 females, there were 99.00 males.  For every 100 females age 18 and over, there were 95.50 males.

The median income for a household in the county was $28,099, and the median income for a family was $34,018. Males had a median income of $23,169 versus $18,292 for females. The per capita income for the county was $15,068.  About 12.90% of families and 16.90% of the population were below the poverty line, including 21.60% of those under age 18 and 13.30% of those age 65 or over.

Infrastructure
The town is served by the Southeast Colorado Hospital. Springfield Municipal Airport is located a few miles north of Springfield.

Politics
Like all of the High Plains, Baca County has long been overwhelmingly Republican. The last Democrat to carry the county was Lyndon Johnson in his 1964 landslide – when he carried all but three Colorado counties.

Communities

Town
Campo
Pritchett
Springfield (county seat) 
Two Buttes
Vilas
Walsh

Unincorporated communities
Deora
Lycan
Utleyville

See also

Outline of Colorado
Index of Colorado-related articles
Colorado census statistical areas
National Register of Historic Places listings in Baca County, Colorado

References

External links

Official Baca County website
Baca County History
Colorado County Evolution by Don Stanwyck
Colorado Historical Society
 Town of Campo official website
 Town of Springfield official website
 Town of Walsh official website

 
1889 establishments in Colorado
Colorado counties
Eastern Plains
Populated places established in 1889